Clear Creek is a stream in Barry, Lawrence and Newton counties in southwest Missouri. It is a tributary to Shoal Creek.

The stream flows northwest passing under U.S. Route 60 and through the south side of city of Monett. It enters the southwest corner of Lawrence County and passes just south of Pierce City and under Missouri Route 97. It enters Newton County and passes north of the community of Berwick and enters Shoal Creek 2.5 miles west of Berwick and two miles east of Ritchey.

Early settlers in Lawrence County named the stream for its clear waters.

References

Rivers of Barry County, Missouri
Rivers of Lawrence County, Missouri
Rivers of Newton County, Missouri
Rivers of Missouri